Dease Lake Airport  is located  south of Dease Lake, British Columbia, Canada.

Airlines and destinations

References

External links
Page about this airport on COPA's Places to Fly airport directory

More Info on Dease Lake Airport

Registered aerodromes in British Columbia
Stikine Country
Cassiar Country